The following outline is provided as an overview of and topical guide to the U.S. state of Indiana:

Indiana – a U.S. state, was admitted to the United States as the 19th state on December 11, 1816. It is located in the midwestern United States and Great Lakes Region of North America. With 6,483,802 residents, as of the 2010 U.S. Census, the state is ranked 15th in population and 16th in population density. Indiana is ranked 38th in land area and is the smallest state in the contiguous U.S. west of the Appalachian Mountains. Indiana's capital and largest city is Indianapolis, the second largest of any state capital and largest state capital east of the Mississippi River.

General reference 

 Names
 Common name: Indiana
 Pronunciation: 
 Official name: State of Indiana
 Abbreviations and name codes
 Postal symbol:  IN
 ISO 3166-2 code:  US-IN
 Internet second-level domain:  .in.us
 Nicknames
 Crossroads of America (previously used on license plates)
 Hoosier State
 Hospitality State
 Adjectivals
 Indiana
 Hoosier
 Demonyms
 Hoosier
 Indianian (usage disparaged)
 Indianan (usage disparaged)

Geography of Indiana 

Geography of Indiana
 Indiana is: a U.S. state, a federal state of the United States of America
 Location
 Northern hemisphere
 Western hemisphere
 Americas
 North America
 Anglo America
 Northern America
 United States of America
 Contiguous United States
 Central United States
 Corn Belt
 Rust Belt
 East North Central States
 Midwestern United States
 Great Lakes Region
 Population of Indiana: 6,483,802 (2010 U.S. Census)
 Area of Indiana (land and water): 
 Atlas of Indiana

Places in Indiana 
 Historic places in Indiana
 National Historic Landmarks in Indiana
 National Register of Historic Places listings in Indiana
 Bridges on the National Register of Historic Places in Indiana
 National Natural Landmarks in Indiana
 Hoosier National Forest
 National parks in Indiana
 State parks in Indiana

Environment of Indiana 
 Climate of Indiana
 Climate change in Indiana
 Protected areas in Indiana
 Hoosier National Forest
 State forests of Indiana
 Superfund sites in Indiana
 Wildlife of Indiana
 Fauna of Indiana
 Birds of Indiana
 Flora of Indiana
Ecoregions of Indiana

Natural geographic features of Indiana 
 Lakes of Indiana
 Rivers of Indiana
 Ohio River
 Wabash River
 Kankakee River

Man-made geographical features of Indiana 
 List of dams and reservoirs in Indiana

Regions of Indiana 

 Central Indiana
 Northern Indiana
 Northeastern Indiana
 Northwest Indiana
 Southern Indiana
 Southwestern Indiana

Administrative divisions of Indiana 
 The 92 counties of the state of Indiana
 Municipalities in Indiana
 Cities in Indiana
 State capital of Indiana: Indianapolis
 City nicknames in Indiana
 Towns in Indiana
 Townships in Indiana
 Census-designated places in Indiana

Demography of Indiana 

Demographics of Indiana

Government and politics of Indiana 

Politics of Indiana
 Form of government: U.S. state government
 Indiana State Capitol

Federal government in Indiana 
 United States congressional delegations from Indiana
List of United States senators from Indiana
List of United States representatives from Indiana
United States congressional districts in Indiana
United States courts in Indiana
United States Court of Appeals for the Seventh Circuit
United States District Court for the Northern District of Indiana
United States District Court for the Southern District of Indiana

Elections and political parties in Indiana 
Elections in Indiana
 Electoral reform in Indiana
 Political party strength in Indiana

Branches of the government of Indiana 

Government of Indiana

Executive branch of the government of Indiana 
 Governor of Indiana
 Previous governors
 Lieutenant Governor of Indiana
 Secretary of State of Indiana
 Indiana State Treasurer
 Indiana Attorney General
 Indiana State Auditor
 Indiana Superintendent of Public Instruction
 State departments
 Indiana Department of Administration
 Indiana Department of Corrections
 Indiana Department of Education
 Indiana State Department of Health
 Indiana Department of Natural Resources
 Indiana State Police
 Indiana Department of Transportation

Legislative branch of the government of Indiana 

 Indiana General Assembly (bicameral)
 Upper house: Indiana Senate
 Lower house: Indiana House of Representatives
 Speaker of the Indiana House of Representatives

Judicial branch of the government of Indiana 

Courts of Indiana
 Indiana Judicial Nominating Commission
 Supreme Court of Indiana
 Indiana Court of Appeals
 Indiana Circuit Courts

Law and order in Indiana 

Law of Indiana
 Indiana Code
 Cannabis in Indiana
 Capital punishment in Indiana
 Individuals executed in Indiana
 Constitution of Indiana
 Crime in Indiana
 Gun laws in Indiana
 Indiana Day
 Law enforcement in Indiana
 Law enforcement agencies in Indiana
 Indiana State Police
 Same-sex marriage in Indiana

Military in Indiana 
 Indiana National Guard
 Indiana Adjutant General
 Indiana Air National Guard
 Indiana Army National Guard

Local government in Indiana 

 County government
 City government
 Town government
  Indiana Township Trustee

History of Indiana 

History of Indiana

By period 

Indigenous peoples
Evidence of human activity date as early 8000 BC.
Hopewell culture developed agriculture and begins Indiana's first permanent settlements. 200 BC-400 AD
Mississippian culture supersedes the Hopewells, who disappeared for unknown reasons, 900
Mississippians build Angel Mounds, 1000.
Beaver Wars begin between the Iroquois Confederacy and the Algonquian Confederacy depopulates much of Indiana. c.1580 - 1701
French fur traders enter Indiana and establish Tassinong, the first European outpost in Indiana, 1673
Sieur de La Salle explores much of Indiana for the first time, claiming it for Louis XIV of France, 1679
Algonquian tribes (including Miami, Wea, Shawnee, Pottawatomie) return to Indiana. 1680-1700
Indiana is part of the French colony of Louisiane, 1699–1763
Vincennes is founded along the Buffalo Trace, 1732
French and Indian War breaks out, British capture the French outposts in Indiana, 1760–1761
Pontiac's Rebellion spreads to Indiana, 1763.
The Treaty of Paris of 1763 grants Indiana to the United Kingdom
Indiana becomes part of the British (Francophone) Province of Quebec, 1763–1783
Indiana is part of protected native lands, and closed to settlement. 1769-1773
American Revolutionary War, April 19, 1775 – September 3, 1783
United States Declaration of Independence, July 4, 1776
George Rogers Clark invades Indiana capturing key British holdings in the Illinois Campaign. 1778-1783
Treaty of Paris, September 3, 1783
Unorganized territory of the United States, 1783–1787
Virginia gives Indiana to the United States Government, 1784.
Northwest Indian War, 1785–1795
Harmar campaign, 1790
Northwest Territory, (1787–1800)–1803
Treaty of Greenville signed, opening part of Indiana for settlement for the first time by Americans, 1795
Territory of Indiana, 1800–1816
Treaty of Fort Wayne is signed, opening up much of southern Indiana to settlement, 1809.
Administration of the District of Louisiana, 1804–1805
Slavery in Indiana becomes a major issue, 1805.
Tecumseh's War, 1811–1812
Battle of Tippecanoe, 1811
Yellow Jackets
Indiana in the War of 1812, June 18, 1812 – March 23, 1815
Tecumseh's War merges with the War of 1812
Siege of Fort Harrison, September 1812
Siege of Fort Wayne, September 1812
Battle of Wild Cat Creek, November 1812
Battle of the Mississinewa, December 1812
Treaty of Ghent, December 24, 1814
State of Indiana becomes 19th state admitted to the United States of America on December 11, 1816
Treaty of St. Mary's is signed, opening most of central Indiana for settlement, 1819
Bank of Indiana created, 1832
Indiana verges on bankruptcy, almost all of the state's public works are liquidated by the creditors, 1841
Most of the native tribes are removed from Indiana, 1838–1846.
Treaty of the Wabash signed, opening most of northern Indiana to settlement, 1840
William Henry Harrison becomes ninth President of the United States on March 4, 1841
Mexican–American War, April 25, 1846 – February 2, 1848
Indiana's population exceeds 1 million, 1850
Indiana adopted a new constitution, 1851
Abraham Lincoln becomes 16th President of the United States on March 4, 1861
American Civil War, April 12, 1861 – May 13, 1865
Indiana in the American Civil War
Morgan's Raid, June 11 – July 26, 1863
Battle of Corydon, July 9, 1863
Natural gas is discovered near Eaton, Indiana, 1876
Indiana Gas Boom begins, 1884
Natural gas supplies run low, ended the boom, 1905
Benjamin Harrison becomes 23rd President of the United States on March 4, 1889
Vietnam War, September 26, 1959 – April 30, 1975
Indiana adopts a series of constitutional amendments that alter the makeup of the government, 1970–1971

By region 

 By city
 History of Fort Wayne, Indiana
 Forts of Fort Wayne, Indiana
 History of Hartford City, Indiana
 History of Indianapolis

By subject 

 History of slavery in Indiana
 History of sports in Indiana
 History of sports in Fort Wayne, Indiana

More 
:Category:History of Indiana
commons:Category:History of Indiana

Culture of Indiana 

Culture of Indiana
 Cuisine of Indiana
 Museums in Indiana
 Religion in Indiana
 Episcopal Diocese of Indianapolis
 Scouting in Indiana
 State symbols of Indiana
 Flag of the state of Indiana 
 Great Seal of the State of Indiana

The arts in Indiana 
 Music of Indiana

Sports in Indiana 

Sports in Indiana

Economy and infrastructure of Indiana 

Economy of Indiana
 Communications in Indiana
 Newspapers in Indiana
 Radio stations in Indiana
 Television stations in Indiana
 Telephone area codes in Indiana
 Energy in Indiana
 List of power stations in Indiana
 Wind power in Indiana
 Health care in Indiana
 Hospitals in Indiana
 Transportation in Indiana
 Airports in Indiana
 Railroads in Indiana
 Roads in Indiana
 Interstate Highways in Indiana
 List of U.S. Routes in Indiana
 Indiana Toll Road
 State roads in Indiana
  Former state highways in Indiana
 List of numbered roads in Indiana

Education in Indiana 

Education in Indiana
 Schools in Indiana
 School districts in Indiana
 High schools in Indiana
 Colleges and universities in Indiana
 Indiana University
 Indiana State University

See also

Topic overview:
Indiana

Index of Indiana-related articles

References

External links 

Indiana
Indiana
 Outline